SpywareQuake is a fake anti-malware program for Microsoft Windows. It is commonly installed by Trojan Horse programs, but can be manually installed.

SpywareQuake's latest update was on February 13, 2007, at 11:49:07 AM. No later updates were ever recorded.

References

Rogue software
Scareware